St. Mary's Church (also known as Dormition of the Holy Virgin Church) is an Orthodox church in Moscopole, Korçë County, Albania. It is a Cultural Monument of Albania. The church was probably built between 1694 and 1699, and decorated in 1712.

References

Cultural Monuments of Albania
Churches in Moscopole
Buildings and structures completed in 1699